Nasser El Sonbaty (October 15, 1965 – March 20, 2013) was an IFBB professional bodybuilder. He represented FR Yugoslavia at competitions.

Early life
Sonbaty was born in the German city of Stuttgart to an Egyptian father and a Yugoslav mother from Novi Pazar, Serbia. Sonbaty was a graduate of the University of Augsburg with a degree in history, political science, and sociology. He had two sisters and two brothers.

Career
Sonbaty began bodybuilding in 1983. His first competition was a Junior State Championship in Germany in 1985, where he placed 6th. His first appearance in the Mr. Olympia competition was in 1994, where he placed 7th. In total, Sonbaty competed in 13 amateur shows and 53 IFBB Pro shows. He qualified for 10 consecutive Mr. Olympia contests and entered nine Mr. Olympia competitions. His best placing in the Mr. Olympia competition was in 1997, where he placed 2nd.

Sonbaty was known for posing and training while wearing his trademark round spectacles; alongside his fluency in several languages, this is likely the basis for his nickname, "The Professor". Despite weighing over 300 lbs in the offseason, he could still show his full abdominal muscles. He has been featured in many international fitness and bodybuilding magazines, articles as well as being pictured on over 60 covers.

Personal life
Sonbaty split his time between San Diego, California and Costa Mesa, California. He died in his sleep during a visit to Cairo on March 20, 2013.

Stats
Height: 5'11"
Competition weight: between 265 lbs (120 kg) and 290 lbs (131 kg)
Off Season weight: between 300 lbs (136 kg) and 315 lbs (143 kg)

Pro contest history
1990 Grand Prix Finland, 8th
1990 Grand Prix France, 7th
1990 Grand Prix Holland, 8th
1991 Night of Champions, Did not place
1992 Chicago Pro Invitational, 19th
1992 Night of Champions, Did not place
1993 Grand Prix France, 3rd
1993 Grand Prix Germany, 3rd
1994 Grand Prix France, 4th
1994 Grand Prix Germany, 4th
1994 Night of Champions, 2nd
1994 Mr. Olympia, 7th
1995 Grand Prix England, 4th
1995 Grand Prix France, 3rd
1995 Grand Prix Germany, 3rd
1995 Grand Prix Russia, 3rd
1995 Grand Prix Spain, 3rd
1995 Grand Prix Ukraine, 2nd
1995 Houston Pro Invitational, 1st
1995 Night of Champions, 1st
1995 Mr. Olympia, 3rd
1996 Grand Prix Czech Republic, 1st
1996 Grand Prix England, 2nd
1996 Grand Prix Germany, 2nd
1996 Grand Prix Russia, Winner 
1996 Grand Prix Spain, 3rd
1996 Grand Prix Switzerland, 1st
1996 Mr. Olympia, 3rd
1997 Arnold Classic, 2nd
1997 Grand Prix Czech Republic, 3rd
1997 Grand Prix England, 3rd
1997 Grand Prix Finland, 4th
1997 Grand Prix Germany, 2nd
1997 Grand Prix Hungary, 2nd
1997 Grand Prix Russia, 3rd
1997 Grand Prix Spain, 2nd
1997 Mr. Olympia, 2nd
1997 San Jose Pro Invitational, 2nd
1998 Arnold Classic, 2nd
1998 Grand Prix Finland, 3rd
1998 Grand Prix Germany, 3rd
1998 Mr. Olympia, 3rd
1999 Arnold Classic, 1st
1999 Grand Prix England, 6th
1999 Mr. Olympia, 6th
1999 World Pro Championships, 6th
2000 Mr. Olympia, 5th
2001 Mr. Olympia, 9th
2002 Arnold Classic, 10th
2002 Mr. Olympia, 15th
2004 Night of Champions, 15th
2004 Show of Strength Pro Championship, 14th
2005 Europa Supershow, 14th

Training videos
Nasser On The Way - Video Part I - 1999
Nasser On The Way - Video Part II - 2000
Nasser On The Way - Video Part III - 2001
Nasser On The Way - Video Part IV - 2002
Nasser On The Way - Video Part V - 2003
Nasser On The Way - Video Part VI - 2004
Nasser On The Way - Video Part VII - 2005

See also
List of male professional bodybuilders
List of female professional bodybuilders

References

External links
 Gallery of Nasser El Sonbaty  (his images will be hosted here in the near future)
  Nasser's Official Site  (Site taken down due to legal issues.)

1965 births
2013 deaths
German Muslims
Professional bodybuilders
Yugoslav bodybuilders
German bodybuilders
German people of Egyptian descent
German people of Serbian descent
German people of Bosnia and Herzegovina descent